Xaver Kraus (born 10 December 1934) is a German former biathlete. He competed in the 20 km individual event at the 1968 Winter Olympics.

References

External links
 

1934 births
Living people
German male biathletes
Olympic biathletes of West Germany
Biathletes at the 1968 Winter Olympics
People from Traunstein (district)
Sportspeople from Upper Bavaria